Calhoun State Prison is located in Morgan, Georgia in Calhoun County, Georgia. The facility houses Adult Male Felons with a capacity of 1539. It was constructed in 1993 and opened in 1994. It was renovated in 1999 and 2008. It is a Medium Security Prison.

References
Georgia Department of Corrections

Buildings and structures in Calhoun County, Georgia
Prisons in Georgia (U.S. state)
1994 establishments in Georgia (U.S. state)